Naveen Pilania is an Indian politician and member of the National People's Party. Pilania is a first term member of the Rajasthan Legislative Assembly in 2013 from the  Amber constituency in Jaipur. He later joined Bahujan Samaj Party.

He completed B.E Mechanical from M.B.M Engineering College, Jodhpur University in 1988.

References 

Politicians from Jaipur
Rajasthan MLAs 2013–2018
Bharatiya Janata Party politicians from Rajasthan
Living people
National People's Party (India) politicians from Rajasthan
Rajasthani politicians
Year of birth missing (living people)
Bahujan Samaj Party politicians